The Flint Hills Discovery Center is a municipal heritage and science center located in the city of Manhattan, Kansas. Featured within the facility are exhibits detailing local history and preservation of the Flint Hills, a theater, a specialized interactive playground for youth and parents, and a temporary exhibition gallery. The facility also promotes various educational outreach programs for youth and adults and serves as a venue for special events.

Exhibits
The Flint Hills Discovery Center features exhibits that explore the ecology, history, and culture of the Flint Hills in Kansas and Oklahoma.  It also hosts traveling and temporary exhibits on related themes. The permanent exhibits are arranged in nine topical zones including an immersive theater experience.

Main floor exhibits zones
Shaping Winds and Water - a brief overview of the geologic formation of the area and the eventual formation of the grasslands.
Blowing Winds in a Tallgrass prairie - details on biological diversity on the grasslands and how local flora and fauna contribute to the area.
The Underground Forest - details on the biologic diversity within the soils, how soils come to be and how they are maintained.
Winds of the Past - an overview of native North American settlers and their interaction with the Flint Hills region over time.
Where the Air is so Pure - an overview on the impact of European immigrants, the displacement and relocation of the native North Americans, and the increased land development for cattle ranching.
Voices of the Flint Hills - a videographic editorial of the opinions from area citizens on numerous subjects including water use, wind power, controlled burning, and cultural inspiration within the region.

Tallgrass Prairie: Tides of Time
The Horizon Ranch Flint Hills Immersive Experience Theater is an immersive theater that features Tallgrass Prairie: Tides of Time a short introductory film that highlights the ecology, history, and culture of the Flint Hills. The film includes special effects  to give the audience an elevated sensory immersion.

Second floor exhibit zones
Prairie Playscape - a specialized interactive playground for youth and parents that was renovated in 2022. It offers multiple interactive exhibits in three themed areas - exploring the land, working the land, and sharing the land.

Tallgrass Gallery
The Tallgrass Gallery is a 2,000 square foot exhibition space that hosts a variety of traveling and in-house produced exhibits.

Prairie Garden Terrace and Trail
An outdoor exhibit highlighting unique building and landscape features as well as topics important to the Flint Hills.

Annual Events
The Discovery Center hosts several annual events throughout the year
Kansas Day - a celebration of Kansas on January 29
Flint Hills Festival - festival focusing on the history, culture, and resources of the Flint Hills
National Day of the Cowboy - celebration of the cowboy held on the fourth Saturday of July
Community Day - free day held in August
Breakfast with Santa - holiday event celebrated the first two Saturdays in December
Family New Year's Eve - family friendly new year celebration on December 31

References

External links
Official website
FHDC in the City of Manhattan

Museums established in 2012
Museums in Riley County, Kansas
Science museums in Kansas
Manhattan, Kansas
Nature centers in Kansas
Natural history museums in Kansas